You'll Never See Me Again is a 1973 American TV film directed by Jeannot Szwarc. It was based on a story by Cornell Woolrich. It aired on February 28, 1973.

Cast
David Hartman
Jane Wyatt
Ralph Meeker
Ben Gazzara

References

External links
You'll Never See Me Again at Letterbox DVD
You'll Never See Me Again at IMDb
You'll Never See Me Again at BFI

1973 television films
1973 films
American television films
Films directed by Jeannot Szwarc